The 1898 Kentucky Derby was the 24th running of the Kentucky Derby. The race took place on May 4, 1898.

Full results

 Winning breeder: Dr. John D. Neet (KY)

Payout
 The winner received a purse of $4,850.
 Second place received $700.
 Third place received $300.

References

1898
Kentucky Derby
Derby
May 1898 sports events
1898 in American sports